The San Miguel Foundation for the Performing Arts was a multi-awarded performing arts group of the Philippines. It was founded in May 2001 by Eduardo "Danding" Cojuangco and musician Ryan Cayabyab and aims to be a staunch advocate in the preservation, performance, and development of Filipino music.

The foundation consists of two major performing groups: the San Miguel Philharmonic Orchestra and the San Miguel Master Chorale. These performing groups have premiered over a hundred Filipino compositions and arrangements in various concerts and recordings. The Foundation also undertakes co-production with other agencies to promote Filipino music.

Disbandment
The SMFPA, together with the San Miguel Master Chorale and Philharmonic Orchestra, was disbanded in late January 2007 by the San Miguel Corporation.

External links
https://web.archive.org/web/20070928201028/http://www.sanmiguelperformingarts.com/ 
The SMFPA Official Website as archived from Wayback Machine

2001 establishments in the Philippines
2007 disestablishments in the Philippines
Filipino orchestras
Disbanded orchestras
San Miguel Corporation
Musical groups established in 2001
Musical groups disestablished in 2007